Rugby Town Football Club was an English football club based in Rugby, Warwickshire.

History
The club was formed in 1946 under the name Rugby Town Amateurs. Their ground was at Thornfield. They joined the Central Amateur League in 1946, and were champions in 1947–48, after which they moved to the United Counties League. In 1950 they amalgamated with Rugby Oakfield and from then on the name was shortened to Rugby Town.  Thereafter the Oakfield ground was used.  For the 1950/1 season they joined the Birmingham Combination, in which they played until 1954 winning the championship that season which was the final season of that competition. They then joined The  Birmingham & District League where they played for four seasons. For the 1958/9 season they joined the Southern League where they stayed for the rest of their existence. They were members of the Southern league Premier Division 1962-1966 and 1968/9. They were winners of The Birmingham Senior Cup in 1970/1.

In 1973 the owners of Oakfield refused to renew the lease of the ground thus putting the club out of business. The limited company was wound up that autumn.

Other clubs that have since used the name Rugby Town have no connection with this club.

References

External links
Football Club History Database

Central Amateur League
United Counties League
Birmingham Combination
West Midlands (Regional) League
Southern Football League clubs
Midland Football Combination
Association football clubs established in 1945
1945 establishments in England
Rugby, Warwickshire
Defunct football clubs in England
Association football clubs disestablished in 2004
2004 disestablishments in England
Defunct football clubs in Warwickshire